The Wikio Group is a group of online startup enterprises in the field of social media marketing. It includes the brands Ebuzzing, Nomao, Overblog, Wikio News, Wikio Buzz and Wikio Experts.

The group employs over 130 people in total and holds offices in Paris, Toulouse, London, Rome, Milan and Luxembourg. In 2010, the Wikio Group doubled its revenue to more than 10 million Euro. With more than 27 million unique users per month, the group is one of the leaders for social media in Europe today.

History 
The information portal Wikio was founded in June 2006 by Pierre Chappaz. In December 2009, it was joined by Ebuzzing which is a service bringing together bloggers and companies. The merger enabled Wikio to further establish itself on the European market for social media marketing. Wikio also acquired the Italian buzz platform Promodigital and in March 2010 it took over Neotia, a Buzz Monitoring and Online Reputation Management Platform.

In September 2010, Wikio and OverBlog fused and created the Wikio Group in order to become the market leader. Pierre Chappaz became the head of this new group. The latest company to join Wikio was Nomao, a local search engine. It merged with the Wikio Group in October 2010. In March 2011, Wikio Group acquired HappyApps, a startup that helps companies market on Facebook.

References

External links
 
 

News aggregators
Online companies of France
Digital marketing companies